The National Yogurt Association (NYA) was a non-profit trade organization in the United States that represented the manufacturers and marketers of live and active culture yogurt products as well as suppliers to the yogurt industry.

Dissolution 
In December 2018, the NYA board of directors voted to dissolve  into the International Dairy Foods Association on January 10, 2019. However, the NYA website would stay up until around February 19, 2019.

References

External links
 NYA official website

Non-profit organizations based in the United States
Food industry trade groups
Yogurts